Knowlton was a halt on the East Kent Light Railway. It opened on 16 October 1916 as Tilmanstone Village but was renamed the following year. It closed to passenger traffic after the last train on 30 October 1948. After closure the platform was demolished and the area landscaped into a field. As at December 2011 the shallow cutting along which the railway ran at this site is still visible.

References

External links
www.disused-stations.org.uk

Disused railway stations in Kent
Former East Kent Light Railway stations
Railway stations in Great Britain opened in 1916
Railway stations in Great Britain closed in 1948